is a district of Chiyoda, Tokyo, Japan, consisting of 1-chōme to 3-chōme. As of April 1, 2007, its population is 1,044.

This district is located on the northern part of Chiyoda Ward. It borders Kanda-Misakichō to the north, (across Kinda-dōri Ave) Kanda-Sarugakuchō to the east, Kanda-Jinbōchō to the south, and (across the Nihonbashi River) Kudankita and Iidabashi to the west.

District

Nishi-Kanda 1-chōme
Nihon University College of Economics (2nd, 3rd and 5th Building)
Kanda Catholic Church

Nishi-Kanda 2-chōme
Nihon University College of Law (7th and 9th Building, Library)
Nihon University Correspondence Division  (1st Building)

Nishi-Kanda 3-chōme
Asahi Press

Education
 operates public elementary and junior high schools. Ochanomizu Elementary School (お茶の水小学校) is the zoned elementary school for Nishi-Kanda 1-3 chōme. There is a freedom of choice system for junior high schools in Chiyoda Ward, and so there are no specific junior high school zones.

Nihon University College of Economics 2nd, 3rd and 5th Buildings are in Nishi-Kanda, as are Nihon University College of Law 7th and 9th Buildings and Library.

References

Districts of Chiyoda, Tokyo